{{Infobox album
| name       = Jackie's Pal
| type       = studio
| artist     = Jackie McLean Quintet
| cover      = Jackie's_Pal.jpg
| alt        =
| released   = February 1957
| recorded   = August 31, 1956Van Gelder Studio, Hackensack
| venue      =
| studio     =
| genre      = Jazz
| length     = 42:09
| label      = PrestigePRLP 7068
| producer   = Bob Weinstock
| prev_title = 4, 5 and 6
| prev_year  = 1956
| next_title = McLean's Scene
| next_year  = 1956
| misc       = {{Extra album cover
 | header  = Alternative cover
 | type    = Album
 | cover   = Jackie_mclean_steeplechase.jpg
 | border  =
 | alt     =
 | caption = Steeplechase (1963, NJ 8290)}}
}}Jackie's Pal is a studio album by saxophonist Jackie McLean, his third issued recording for Prestige Records. It was recorded in 1956 and first released as PRLP 7068. In 1963, like the previous 4, 5 and 6, the album was reissued on the Prestige subsidiary label New Jazz Records, as NJ 8290, with a different cover and retitled Steeplechase. It was reissued on CD in 1991 under the original title. It features McLean in a quintet with trumpeter Bill Hardman, bassist Paul Chambers and drummer Philly Joe Jones.

Track listing 
"Sweet Doll" (McLean) - 6:06
"Just for Marty" (Bill Hardman) - 6:39
"Dee's Dilemma (Mal Waldron) - 7:06
"Sublues (Hardman) - 8:03
"Steeplechase" (Charlie Parker) - 8:12
"It Could Happen to You" (Johnny Burke, Jimmy Van Heusen) - 6:03

Personnel
Jackie McLean - alto sax (except track 6)
Bill Hardman - trumpet
Mal Waldron - piano
Paul Chambers - bass
Philly Joe Jones - drums

References 

1957 albums
Jackie McLean albums
Albums produced by Bob Weinstock
Prestige Records albums